There are many different numeral systems, that is, writing systems for expressing numbers.

By culture / time period

By type of notation
Numeral systems are classified here as to whether they use positional notation (also known as place-value notation), and further categorized by radix or base.

Standard positional numeral systems

The common names are derived somewhat arbitrarily from a mix of Latin and Greek, in some cases including roots from both languages within a single name. There have been some proposals for standardisation.

Non-standard positional numeral systems

Bijective numeration

Signed-digit representation

Negative bases
The common names of the negative base numeral systems are formed using the prefix nega-, giving names such as:

Complex bases

Non-integer bases

n-adic number

Mixed radix
 Factorial number system {1, 2, 3, 4, 5, 6, ...}
 Even double factorial number system {2, 4, 6, 8, 10, 12, ...}
 Odd double factorial number system {1, 3, 5, 7, 9, 11, ...}
 Primorial number system {2, 3, 5, 7, 11, 13, ...}
 Fibonorial number system {1, 2, 3, 5, 8, 13, ...}
 {60, 60, 24, 7} in timekeeping
 {60, 60, 24, 30 (or 31 or 28 or 29), 12, 10, 10, 10} in timekeeping
 (12, 20) traditional English monetary system (£sd)
 (20, 18, 13) Maya timekeeping

Other
 Quote notation
 Redundant binary representation
 Hereditary base-n notation
 Asymmetric numeral systems optimized for non-uniform probability distribution of symbols
 Combinatorial number system

Non-positional notation
All known numeral systems developed before the Babylonian numerals are non-positional, as are many developed later, such as the Roman numerals.  The French Cistercian monks created their own numeral system.

See also

 
 
 
 
 
  
 Table of bases – 0 to 74 in base 2 to 36

References

 
Systems